Method Road Soccer Stadium (usually called Method Road) was the on campus soccer stadium at North Carolina State University in Raleigh, North Carolina. The stadium was opened in the summer of 1984.

Method Road held 3,000 spectators before the bleachers were removed following the construction of Dail Soccer Field. The playing field has been retained for student use.

Method Road also hosts the Wolfpack club lacrosse team that competes in the Men's Collegiate Lacrosse Association.

References

External links
 Information at NCSU athletics
 Satellite image at Google Maps

North Carolina State University
Lacrosse venues in North Carolina
Soccer venues in North Carolina
Sports venues in Raleigh, North Carolina
NC State Wolfpack sports venues
College soccer venues in the United States
College lacrosse venues in the United States
1984 establishments in North Carolina
Sports venues completed in 1984